The following outline is provided as an overview of and topical guide to Toronto:

Toronto is the largest city in Canada and the provincial capital of Ontario. It is located in Southern Ontario on the northwestern shore of Lake Ontario. Toronto is a relatively modern city. Its history begins in the late 18th century, when the British Crown  purchased its land from the Mississaugas of the New Credit.

General reference 
 Pronunciation:
 Pronunciation abroad: 
 Local pronunciation: 
 Name of Toronto

Geography of Toronto 

Geography of Toronto
 Toronto is: a city in Canada, and provincial capital of Ontario

Location of Toronto 

Toronto is situated in the following regions:
Northern Hemisphere, Western Hemisphere
Americas
North America
Northern America
Laurentia
Canada
Central Canada
Eastern Canada
Canadian Shield
Ontario
Southern Ontario
Golden Horseshoe
Greater Toronto and Hamilton Area
Greater Toronto Area
Time zone:  Eastern Standard Time (UTC-05), Eastern Daylight Time (UTC-04)

Geographic features of Toronto

Environment of Toronto 
 Fauna of Toronto
 Flora of Toronto
 Native trees in Toronto

Landforms of Toronto 
 Toronto Harbour
 Toronto Islands
 Toronto ravine system
 Toronto waterway system
 Scarborough Bluffs
 Leslie Street Spit

Areas of Toronto 

 Districts of Toronto
 Old Toronto
 Downtown Toronto
 East Toronto
 East York
 Etobicoke
 Scarborough
 North York
 York
 Neighbourhoods in Toronto
 City designated neighbourhoods in Toronto
 Business improvement areas
 Toronto waterfront

Locations in Toronto 

 Baseball parks in Toronto
 Cinemas in Toronto
 Hotels in Toronto
 Museums in Toronto
 Toronto Public Library branches
 Shopping malls in Toronto

Parks and zoos in Toronto 
 List of Toronto parks
 Riverdale Zoo
 Toronto Zoo

Other 
 Allan Gardens
 Art Gallery of Ontario
 Black Creek Pioneer Village
 Canada's Walk of Fame
 Canada's Wonderland in Vaughan, Ontario
 Canadian Aboriginal Festival
 Canadian National Exhibition
 Caribana Festival
 Casa Loma
 Centreville Amusement Park
 Cherry Beach
 CHUM-City Building
 CN Tower
 Colborne Lodge
 Design Exchange
 Distillery District 
 Fort Rouillé
 Fort York
 Gibraltar Point Lighthouse
 Gibson House
 Harbourfront
 Harbourfront Centre
 Hockey Hall of Fame
 Liberty Grand
 Little Canada
 Little Glenn
 Medieval Times
 Montgomery's Inn
 Olympic Spirit Toronto
 Ontario Place
 Ontario Science Centre
 Ripley's Aquarium of Canada
 Rogers Centre
 Royal Ontario Museum
 Spadina House
 St. Lawrence Market
 Taste of the Danforth 
 Wet'n'Wild Toronto, in Brampton, Ontario
 Yorkville

Historic locations in Toronto
 List of historic places in Toronto
 List of historic Toronto fire stations
 List of National Historic Sites of Canada in Toronto

Demographics of Toronto 

 Demographics of Toronto
 Demographics of Toronto neighbourhoods

Government and politics of Toronto 
Government and politics of Toronto
 Municipal elections of Toronto
 City of Toronto government
 List of mayors of Toronto
 Toronto City Council
 Speaker of Toronto City Council
 Toronto Police Service
 Crime in Toronto
 Graffiti in Toronto
 Sister cities of Toronto

History of Toronto 
History of Toronto

History of Toronto, by period
 Timeline of Toronto history
 Great Fire of Toronto
 Great Fire of Toronto (1849)
 Great Fire of Toronto (1904)
 Centennial of the City of Toronto

History of Toronto, by region
 History of neighbourhoods in Toronto
 List of reeves of the former townships and villages in Toronto
 Old Toronto

History of Toronto, by subject 
 Amalgamation of Toronto

Culture in Toronto 
Culture in Toronto
 Architecture of Toronto
 List of tallest buildings in Toronto
 List of oldest buildings and structures in Toronto
 Cuisine of Toronto
 Events in Toronto
 Annual events in Toronto
 List of Asian events in Toronto
 List of Toronto Public Library branches
 Media in Toronto
 List of multicultural media in the Greater Toronto Area
 Museums in Toronto
 Recreation in Toronto
 Annual events in Toronto
 List of people from Toronto
 List of University of Toronto people
 Symbols of Toronto
 Flag of Toronto
 Coat of arms of Toronto

Art in Toronto 
 List of fiction set in Toronto
 Graffiti in Toronto

Cinema of Toronto 
 Cinemas in Toronto
 List of filming locations in Toronto
 List of films set in Toronto
 List of films shot in Toronto
 Toronto International Film Festival
 Toronto Film Critics Association

Music of Toronto 
 List of songs about Toronto
 Toronto Jazz Festival

Religion in Toronto 
 List of cemeteries in Toronto
 Christianity in Toronto
 Archbishop of Toronto and Eastern Canada
 Bishop of Toronto
 List of cathedrals in Toronto
 Diocese of Toronto
 Ecclesiastical Province of Toronto
 Anglicanism in Toronto
 List of Anglican churches in Toronto
 Anglican Diocese of Toronto
 Catholicism in Toronto
 Roman Catholic Archbishops of Toronto
 Roman Catholic Archdiocese of Toronto
 List of Roman Catholic churches in Toronto
 First Christian Reformed Church of Toronto
 First Evangelical Lutheran Church of Toronto
 First Unitarian Congregation of Toronto
 List of Orthodox churches in Toronto
 List of Presbyterian churches in Toronto
 List of United Church of Canada churches in Toronto
 Judaism in Toronto
 List of synagogues in the Greater Toronto Area
 History of the Jews in Toronto

Sports in Toronto 
Toronto sports
 Amateur sport in Toronto
 List of sports teams in Toronto
 Baseball in Toronto
 Toronto Blue Jays (Major League Baseball)
 History of the Toronto Blue Jays
 List of Toronto Blue Jays broadcasters
 List of Toronto Blue Jays first-round draft picks
 List of Toronto Blue Jays managers
 List of Toronto Blue Jays Opening Day starting pitchers
 List of Toronto Blue Jays owners and executives
 List of Toronto Blue Jays seasons
 List of Toronto Blue Jays team records
 Baseball parks in Toronto
 Basketball in Toronto
 Toronto Raptors (National Basketball Association)
 List of Toronto Raptors broadcasters
 List of Toronto Raptors head coaches
 List of Toronto Raptors seasons
 Football in Toronto
 Soccer in Toronto
 Toronto FC (Major League Soccer)
 List of Toronto FC players
 List of Toronto FC Players of the Year
 Canadian football in Toronto
 Toronto Argonauts (Canadian Football League)
 List of Toronto Argonauts head coaches
 List of Toronto Argonauts seasons
 Hockey in Toronto
 List of Toronto Hockey Club seasons
 Toronto Maple Leafs (National Hockey League)
 History of the Toronto Maple Leafs
 List of Toronto Maple Leafs award winners
 List of Toronto Maple Leafs broadcasters
 List of Toronto Maple Leafs draft picks
 List of Toronto Maple Leafs general managers
 List of Toronto Maple Leafs head coaches
 List of Toronto Maple Leafs players
 List of Toronto Maple Leafs records
 List of Toronto Maple Leafs seasons
 Toronto Marlies  (American Hockey League)
 Lacrosse in Toronto
 Toronto Rock (National Lacrosse League)
 Running in Toronto
 Toronto Marathon

Economy and infrastructure of Toronto 
Economy of Toronto
 Toronto Board of Trade
 Health in Toronto
 Toronto Public Health
 List of hospitals in Toronto
 Public services in Toronto
 Toronto Fire Services
 Toronto Police Service
 Toronto Public Library
 Tourism in Toronto
 Attractions in Toronto

Transportation in Toronto 
Transportation in Toronto
 List of airports in the Greater Toronto Area
 Cycling in Toronto
 List of roads in Toronto
 List of east–west roads in Toronto
 List of north–south roads in Toronto
 List of bridges in Toronto
 Toronto Transit Commission (bus system)
 Toronto Transit Commission accessibility
 Toronto Transit Commission buses
 List of Toronto Transit Commission bus routes
 Toronto Transit Commission fares
 Toronto Transit Commission personnel
 Toronto streetcar system
 Toronto streetcar system rolling stock
 Toronto subway and RT
 List of Toronto subway and RT stations
 Toronto subway rolling stock

Education in Toronto 
Education in Toronto
 Conseil scolaire catholique MonAvenir
 Conseil scolaire Viamonde
 Toronto Catholic District School Board
 Toronto District School Board

University of Toronto 
University of Toronto
 Satellite campuses
 University of Toronto Mississauga
 University of Toronto Scarborough
 Departments
 Schools
 Ontario Institute for Studies in Education
 Rotman School of Management
 Toronto School of Theology
 Faculties
 University of Toronto Faculty of Applied Science and Engineering
 John H. Daniels Faculty of Architecture, Landscape and Design
 University of Toronto Faculty of Arts and Science
 University of Toronto Faculty of Dentistry
 University of Toronto Faculty of Information
 University of Toronto Faculty of Law
 University of Toronto Faculty of Medicine
 Other departments and programs
 University Health Network
 Institute for Aerospace Studies
 Canadian Institute for Theoretical Astrophysics
 Institute of Biomaterials and Biomedical Engineering
 Munk School of Global Affairs
 Trudeau Centre for Peace and Conflict Studies
 Pontifical Institute of Mediaeval Studies
 Fields Institute
 Joint Centre for Bioethics
 Institute of Child Study
 Massey Lectures
 Toronto School of communication theory
 University of Toronto Press
 McClelland & Stewart
 UTEC
 Facilities
 Campus
 List of University of Toronto buildings
 Convocation Hall
 Libraries
 Robarts Library
 Thomas Fisher Rare Book Library
 Gerstein Science Information Centre
 Soldiers' Tower
 Varsity Arena
 Varsity Stadium
 Other facilities
 Koffler Scientific Reserve
 David Dunlap Observatory
 Toronto Magnetic and Meteorological Observatory
 University of Toronto Schools
 Student life
 University of Toronto Students' Union
 The Newspaper
 The Varsity 
 The Underground
 CIUT-FM
 CFRE-FM
 Hart House Theatre
 Hart House Review
 Toronto Varsity Blues
 Jennings Cup
 Affiliated colleges
 Emmanuel College
 Innis College
 Knox College
 Massey College
 New College
 Regis College
 University of St. Michael's College
 University of Trinity College
 University College
 Victoria University
 Woodsworth College
 Wycliffe College
 List of University of Toronto people

See also 

 Outline of geography
 Outline of North America
 Outline of Canada
 Outline of Ontario
 City of Toronto Act
 City of Toronto Archives
 City of Toronto Emergency Management Office (OEM)
 City of Toronto Heritage Property Inventory
 Convocation Hall (University of Toronto)
 Hart House (University of Toronto)
 Hill v. Church of Scientology of Toronto
 History of Toronto Island Airport
 Islamic Institute of Toronto
 Lesbian Organization of Toronto
 Live in Toronto (disambiguation)
 Live in Toronto (Psychic TV album)
 Live in Toronto Canada
 Live Peace in Toronto 1969
 Metropolitan Community Church of Toronto
 National Football League in Toronto
 Parachute School of Toronto
 Plague City: SARS in Toronto
 Poet Laureate of Toronto
 Proposal for the Province of Toronto
 R. v. Church of Scientology of Toronto
 Serbs of Toronto
 Sir John Robinson, 1st Baronet, of Toronto
 Sringeri Temple of Toronto
 St. Hilda's College, University of Toronto
 Stephenson House (University of Toronto)
 Taiwanese Canadian Association of Toronto
 Tanenbaum Community Hebrew Academy of Toronto

External links 

 , the official City of Toronto web site
 Tourism Toronto, by the Toronto Convention & Visitors Association
 OPENCities Monitor participant

Toronto
Toronto
Toronto